Streptomyces indoligenes is a Gram-positive bacterium species from the genus of Streptomyces which has been isolated from rhizosphere soil from the tree Populus euphratica in Xinjiang in China.

See also 
 List of Streptomyces species

References 

 

indoligenes
Bacteria described in 2016